Johannes Gerardus Adrianus "John" Lammers (is a Dutch professional football manager and former player who is the head coach of Eerste Divisie club Heracles Almelo.

Playing career
Lammers started his professional career in the 1982–83 season. He played for Willem II Tilburg, RKC Waalwijk, VVV-Venlo, Toulon, NAC Breda, RBC Roosendaal and New Zealand club Auckland Kingz.

Coaching career
After his active career he started to work as an assistant coach, and also served as striker coach at Feyenoord Rotterdam's youth complex. He was subsequently signed by SBV Excelsior as Alex Pastoor's aide at the small Rotterdam-based club. In June 2011, after the departure of Pastoor to NEC, he was promoted as head coach for the new season. After one year to serve as head coach, he left Excelsior in charge of Eerste Divisie club FC Eindhoven. He signed a two-year contract with the club.

In June 2017 he was named new head coach of Danish Superliga club Esbjerg fB. He was dismissed in September 2019.

On 25 June 2022, Heracles Almelo appointed Lammers as head coach on a two-year deal with an option for another year, after the club had suffered relegation to the second-tier Eerste Divisie.

References

External links
  Profile

1963 births
Living people
Footballers from Tilburg
Association football forwards
Dutch footballers
Dutch football managers
Dutch expatriate football managers
National Soccer League (Australia) players
Dutch expatriate footballers
Expatriate footballers in France
Dutch expatriate sportspeople in France
Football Kingz F.C. players
NAC Breda players
RBC Roosendaal players
RKC Waalwijk players
VVV-Venlo players
Willem II (football club) players
SC Toulon players
Ligue 1 players
Eredivisie players
Eerste Divisie players
Excelsior Rotterdam managers
FC Eindhoven managers
Danish Superliga managers
Heracles Almelo managers
Expatriate football managers in Denmark
Dutch expatriate sportspeople in Denmark
Expatriate association footballers in New Zealand
Dutch expatriate sportspeople in New Zealand